Beixin'an station is a subway station on Line 11 of the Beijing Subway. The station opened on December 31, 2021.

Platform Layout
The station has an underground island platform.

Exits
There are 3 exits, lettered A, B1 and C. Exit C is accessible.

References

External links

Beijing Subway stations in Shijingshan District
Railway stations in China opened in 2021